The 1976 Australian Touring Car Championship was a CAMS sanctioned Australian motor racing title for Group C Touring Cars. It was the 17th running of the Australian Touring Car Championship. The championship began at Symmons Plains Raceway on 29 February and ended at the Phillip Island Grand Prix Circuit on 28 November in the longest season in the history of the series. 1976 saw a substantial change to the ATCC calendar which was expanded to eleven rounds, incorporating the end-of-season long distance Australian Championship of Makes races for the first time. These races included Sandown's Hang Ten 400 and the Phillip Island 500K, although notably not the Bathurst 1000.

After contesting only selected rounds of the 1975 championship, Allan Moffat won his second Australian Touring Car Championship in 1976. He won the Calder, Oran Park and Adelaide rounds, building up a mid-season points lead that his rivals could not bridge. At the Hang Ten 400 at Sandown in September, Moffat re-launched his team as the Moffat Ford Dealers team with a new Ford XB Falcon GT, built after Moffat's original car and transporter were destroyed by fire on the way to the Adelaide round in June. Moffat borrowed the Ford Falcon of John Goss for the Adelaide and Lakeside rounds to stay in the series until the new car was built.

Barry Seton, driving a Ford Capri in the Up to 3000 cc class, was Moffat's main title threat for most of the year, winning his class four times, with a best finish of sixth outright at Sandown. Seton lost second place in the championship to Colin Bond when the Holden Torana driver won the final race of the season at Phillip Island. Bond had previously won at Sandown and Lakeside, but had mechanical failures that Moffat, even in his borrowed machinery, did not.

Drivers
The following drivers competed in the 1976 Australian Touring Car Championship.

Calendar
The 1976 Australian Touring Car Championship was contested over eleven rounds.

Class system
Cars competed in two classes, based on engine capacity:
 Up to 3000 cc
 3001 to 6000 cc

Points system
Championship points were awarded to drivers on the following basis:

Points were only awarded to a driver where the car had completed 75% of race distance and was running at the completion of the final lap.

Only the best two results from the four long distance races could be counted by each driver.

Championship standings

Points scored in the long distance races which were not retained for championship totals are shown in the above table within double brackets.

Australian Championship of Makes
The 1976 Australian Championship of Makes was contested over a four-round series, staged concurrently with the final four rounds of the Australian Touring Car Championship. It was the sixth championship for manufacturers to be awarded by CAMS, and the first to be contested under the Australian Championship of Makes name. The title was won by General Motors-Holden's.

Class system
Cars competed in four classes based on engine capacity.
 Up to 1300 cc
 1301 to 2000 cc
 2001 to 3000 cc
 3001 to 6000 cc

Points system
Championship points were awarded in each class on a 9, 6, 4, 3, 2, 1 basis, with the results of all four races counting towards the championship.

References

Australian Touring Car Championship seasons
Touring Cars